Playground Global is an early-stage venture capital firm that invests in deep tech and assists startups with software, hardware, machine learning, marketing, talent and design. The company was founded in 2015 by Andy Rubin, Peter Barrett, Matt Hershenson and Bruce Leak. Playground offers startups support with engineering, distribution, manufacturing and financing in exchange for equity.

In May 2019, Playground returned Rubin's investment and removed him from management, following reports of sexual misconduct alleged to have occurred in 2013 while Rubin was an executive at Google. His smartphone company, Essential Products, remained under the Playground umbrella. The next month, Laurie Yoler joined as Playground's first female general partner; she was already serving on the boards of Bose, Tesla and Church & Dwight, among others. Rubin's Essential Products company failed in February 2020, prompting a rebuild of Playground Global.

Significant investments
Playground Global has raised $800 million across two funds, starting with $300 million in 2015 from its limited partners including Google, HP, Foxconn, Redpoint Ventures, Seagate Technology and Tencent, among others.  This was followed by $500 million raised during Fund II in 2016.  

In June 2015, Playground Global was part of a $20.5 million series A funding round for Nervana Systems, an AI software company acquired by Intel in 2016. In 2017, Playground Global backed Owl Labs, a conferencing devices company, with $1.3 million in seed money. In December 2017, Playground Global led a seed round of $5.7 million for FarmWise to commercialize its automated weeding robot and to continue building autonomous systems which can harvest food for farmers. Playground's Bruce Leak also joined their board of directors. In March 2018, Playground Global led a $35 million funding round for Relativity Space, a startup that develops small launch vehicles with the use of 3-D printing technologies. Playground's Jory Bell joined Relativity's board. In November 2018, Playground Global led a $30 million Series B Funding round for RapidSOS, an emergency response data provider.

References 

Financial services companies established in 2015
Companies based in Palo Alto, California
Venture capital firms of the United States